= Don Vassos =

Canadian football player

Profile
- Position: Halfback

Personal information
- Born: 1938 (age 87–88); Regina, Saskatchewan, Canada
- Listed height: 5 ft 10 in (1.78 m)
- Listed weight: 180 lb (82 kg)

Career information
- University: UBC

Career history
- 1959–1960: BC Lions
- 1961: Saskatchewan Roughriders
- 1962-1963: Edmonton Eskimos

Don Vassos (born 1938) is a Canadian football player who played for the BC Lions, Saskatchewan Roughriders and Edmonton Eskimos. He previously played football for the University of British Columbia.
